The 2010 NCAA Division I FBS football season was the highest level of college football competition in the United States organized by the National Collegiate Athletic Association (NCAA).

The regular season began on September 2, 2010, and ended on December 11, 2010. The postseason concluded on January 10, 2011, with the BCS National Championship Game at University of Phoenix Stadium in Glendale, Arizona. The Auburn Tigers defeated the Oregon Ducks to complete an undefeated season and win their sixth national title in school history.

Rule changes
Wedge blocks are now banned on kickoffs.
Messages on eye-black, such as those worn by Tim Tebow, Reggie Bush, and Case Keenum are no longer allowed.

Conference realignment

Multiple conferences announced changes in membership throughout 2010, triggering a major realignment that would eventually affect all 11 FBS leagues. Due to conference notice requirements, these changes would not take effect until 2011 at the earliest.

The first change came on June 10, when the Pacific-10 Conference announced that Colorado had accepted their invitation to join from the Big 12.

The following day, June 11, saw two schools change conferences. The Mountain West Conference announced that Boise State had accepted their invitation to join from the Western Athletic Conference (WAC), while Nebraska ended its longstanding affiliation with the Big Eight/Big 12 to join the Big Ten Conference. Both moves would take effect starting with the 2011–2012 academic year.

In the following days, it was widely speculated that the five public schools in the Big 12 South Division (Texas, Texas A&M, Texas Tech, Oklahoma, and Oklahoma State) would leave for the Pac-10 to create a 16-team "superconference." However, a last-minute deal announced on June 14 saw Texas remain in the Big 12, prompting the other four schools to follow suit. The Pac-10 then extended an invitation to Utah on June 16, who accepted the next day. With the addition of Colorado and Utah, the Pac-10 announced that the conference would change its name to the Pac-12 upon the two new members joining in July 2011.

On August 18, the Mountain West responded to rumors of the imminent departure of Brigham Young by inviting WAC members Fresno State, Nevada, and Utah State. Utah State declined the offer, but Fresno State and Nevada accepted later that day. Following threats of legal action by the WAC, the two schools agreed to stay in the WAC through the 2011–12 season in exchange for a greatly reduced exit fee. BYU officially announced their departure from the Mountain West on September 1. The BYU football team would become an FBS Independent while all other sports would move West Coast Conference for the 2011–12 season.

On November 11, the Western Athletic Conference announced that Texas State, then a member of the FCS Southland Conference, and UTSA, which planned to launch a football team in 2011, would upgrade their football programs to FBS level, join the WAC in 2012, and become full FBS members in 2013.

On November 29, TCU announced it would leave the Mountain West to join the Big East in 2012. The Mountain West replaced TCU by adding Hawaii as a football-only member on December 10; Hawaii's other sports would join the Big West Conference.

New and updated stadiums
No new stadiums opened in the 2010 season. However, expansion projects at several stadiums were completed in time for the season:
 Alabama: The seventh major expansion of Bryant–Denny Stadium increased the capacity from 92,138 to 101,821.
East Carolina: The east end zone at Dowdy–Ficklen Stadium was enclosed, increasing capacity from 43,000 to 50,000.
 Louisville: A second deck was added to the east side of Papa John's Cardinal Stadium, increasing capacity from its original 42,000 to over 56,000.
 Michigan: Michigan Stadium once again claimed the title of largest college football stadium. The new capacity was officially announced on July 14 as 109,901.
 Texas Tech: Renovations to Jones AT&T Stadium increased the capacity to 60,454 and a new building on the stadium's eastern side added an additional 26 suites and 500 club seats.

Season notes
 USC was not eligible to be ranked in the USA Today Coaches Poll due to NCAA sanctions. They were also prohibited from playing in a bowl.
 On September 11, Virginia Tech, then No. 13 in the AP Poll, was stunned at home by in-state FCS team James Madison. The Dukes' 21–16 victory was only the second by an FCS school over a ranked FBS team, after Appalachian State's historic upset of Michigan in 2007.
 The University of Texas reached an agreement with ESPN to distribute the Longhorn Network on cable systems in the fall of 2011. The deal is for 10 years and guarantees Texas $12 million annually on top of the television revenue UT would receive as part of the Big 12's current television contracts with ABC/ESPN and Fox. The Longhorn Network would be the first sports-centric network for a university and was slated to broadcast third-tier programming, but UT men's athletic director DeLoss Dodds has asked the Big 12 to be allowed to air one football game, and a smattering of men's basketball games.
 The CBS telecast of the Iron Bowl between Alabama and Auburn on November 26, 2010, earned a 7.5 rating, the highest for any game of the 2010 college football season through week 13.

Regular season top 10 matchups
Rankings reflect the AP Poll. Rankings for Week 8 and beyond will list BCS Rankings first and AP Poll second. Teams that failed to be a top 10 team for one poll or the other will be noted.
Week 1
No. 3 Boise State defeated No. 10 Virginia Tech, 33–30 (FedEx Field, Landover, Maryland)
Week 4
No. 1 Alabama defeated No. 10 Arkansas, 24–20 (Donald W. Reynolds Razorback Stadium, Fayetteville, Arkansas)
Week 5
No. 1 Alabama defeated No. 7 Florida, 31–6 (Bryant–Denny Stadium, Tuscaloosa, Alabama)
No. 4 Oregon defeated No. 9 Stanford, 52–31 (Autzen Stadium, Eugene, Oregon)
Week 8
No. 4/5 Auburn defeated No. 6/6 LSU, 24–17 (Jordan–Hare Stadium, Auburn, Alabama)
Week 10
No. 3/4 TCU defeated No. 5/6 Utah, 47–7 (Rice–Eccles Stadium, Salt Lake City, Utah)
No. 10/12 LSU defeated No. 6/5 Alabama, 24–17 (Tiger Stadium, Baton Rouge, Louisiana)

Conference standings

Conference summaries
Rankings reflect the Week 14 AP Poll before the conference championship games were played.

Conference championship games

Other conference champions

* Received conference's automatic BCS bowl bid.

In 2011, Ohio State vacated all twelve wins and their share of the Big Ten title from the 2010 season after it was revealed that several players had committed NCAA violations by receiving improper benefits from a local business owner.

Final BCS rankings

Despite not being in the BCS rankings, Connecticut (8–4) played in the Fiesta Bowl by virtue of being the Big East Conference Champion.

Bowl games

Awards and honors

Heisman Trophy voting
The Heisman Trophy is given to the year's most outstanding player.

Other award winners

Overall
AP Player of the Year: Cameron Newton, Auburn
Maxwell Award (top player): Cameron Newton, Auburn
Walter Camp Award (top player): Cameron Newton, Auburn

Niche 
Campbell Trophy ("academic Heisman", formerly the Draddy Trophy): Sam Acho, Texas
Wuerffel Trophy (humanitarian-athlete): Sam Acho, Texas
Paul Hornung Award (most versatile player): Owen Marecic, Stanford
Burlsworth Trophy (top player who began as walk-on): Sean Bedford, Georgia Tech

Offense
Quarterback
Davey O'Brien Award (quarterback): Cameron Newton, Auburn
Johnny Unitas Award (senior quarterback): Scott Tolzien, Wisconsin
Manning Award (quarterback): Cameron Newton, Auburn
Sammy Baugh Trophy (quarterback, specifically passer): Landry Jones, Oklahoma

Running Back
Doak Walker Award (running back): LaMichael James, Oregon

Wide Receiver
Fred Biletnikoff Award (wide receiver): Justin Blackmon, Oklahoma State

Tight End
John Mackey Award (tight end): D.J. Williams, Arkansas

Lineman

Dave Rimington Trophy (center): Jake Kirkpatrick, TCU
Outland Trophy (interior lineman): Gabe Carimi, Wisconsin

Defense
Bronko Nagurski Trophy (defensive player): Da'Quan Bowers, Clemson
Chuck Bednarik Award (defensive player): Patrick Peterson, LSU
Lott Trophy (defensive impact): J. J. Watt, Wisconsin

Defensive Line
Ted Hendricks Award (defensive end): Da'Quan Bowers, Clemson
Lombardi Award (defensive lineman): Nick Fairley, Auburn
Linebacker
Dick Butkus Award (linebacker): Von Miller, Texas A&M

Defensive Back
Jim Thorpe Award (defensive back): Patrick Peterson, LSU

Special teams
Lou Groza Award (placekicker): Dan Bailey, Oklahoma State
Ray Guy Award (punter): Chas Henry, Florida

Coaches
AP Coach of the Year: Chip Kelly, Oregon
Paul "Bear" Bryant Award: Gene Chizik, Auburn
The Home Depot Coach of the Year Award: Gene Chizik, Auburn
Walter Camp Coach of the Year: Chip Kelly, Oregon
Eddie Robinson Coach of the Year: Chip Kelly, Oregon
Bobby Dodd Coach of the Year Award: Chris Petersen, Boise State
Bobby Bowden National Collegiate Coach of the Year Award: Gene Chizik, Auburn
Assistant
Broyles Award (assistant coach): Gus Malzahn, Auburn

All-Americans

Records
 Penn State football coach, Joe Paterno, in his 45th season, has achieved a feat that no coach in major college football history has ever reached: the 400-win mark. Paterno already held records for the most wins in major college football history as well as the most bowl wins (24) in college football history. 
 Kyle Brotzman of Boise State set a new Division I record for most career points by a kicker. His 439 career points surpassed the former record of 433 by Art Carmody of Louisville.
 Miami (Ohio) became the first team in FBS history to win 10 or more games after losing 10 or more games in the previous season.

Coaching changes

Preseason and in-season
This is restricted to coaching changes that took place on or after May 1, 2010. For coaching changes that occurred earlier in 2010, see 2009 NCAA Division I FBS end-of-season coaching changes.

End of season 
Note:
 All dates in November and December are in 2010; all January dates are in 2011.
 The "resigned/fired" listing indicates that a coach technically resigned, but at least one media report has stated that he was effectively fired.

TV ratings

Ten most watched regular season games in 2010
1. November 26 - Iron Bowl/The Cam-Back - CBS - 2 Auburn vs 9 Alabama - 12.5 Million viewers
2. December 4 - 2010 SEC Championship - CBS - 1 Auburn vs 19 South Carolina - 10.1 Million viewers
3. September 6 - ESPN - 3 Boise State vs. 5 Virginia Tech - 9.9 Million viewers
4. December 4 - 2010 Big 12 Championship - ESPN on ABC - 13 Nebraska vs 10 Oklahoma - 8.98 Million viewers
5. October 2 - CBS - 7 Florida vs 1 Alabama - 8.6 Million viewers
6. November 13 - Deep South's Oldest Rivalry - CBS - Georgia vs 2 Auburn - 8.3 Million viewers
7. September 25 - CBS - 1 Alabama vs 10 Arkansas - 8.2 Million viewers
8. November 26 - ESPN - 21 Arizona vs 1 Oregon - 7.8 Million viewers
9. October 9 - CBS - 1 Alabama vs 19 South Carolina - 7.7 Million viewers
10. September 11 - ESPN - 18 Penn State vs 1 Alabama -7.2 Million viewers

7 of 10 games involved with SEC teams - All seven involved a team from the State of Alabama

Notes and references

External links